Qavam House (also widely called, Narenjestan-e Ghavam) is a traditional and historical house and garden in Shiraz, Iran, built between 1879 and 1886. The building preserves the elegance and refinement enjoyed by the upper-class families during the 19th century. The paintings on the low ceilings of the house are inspired by Victorian-era Europe. The mirrored porch was a focal point of the house, overlooking a small garden that was designed with fountains, date palms, and flowering plants.

During the second Pahlavi era, the House became the headquarters of Pahlavi University's Asia Institute, directed by Arthur Upham Pope, and later Richard Nelson Frye. Frye and his family also lived in the house. The house and gardens are now a museum and are open to the public.

Architecture 
It was built between 1879 and 1886 by Mirza Ibrahim Khan. The Qavam family were merchants originally from Qazvin, but they soon became active in the government during the Zand dynasty, followed by the Qajar, and Pahlavi dynasty as well.

The building stands two meters above the yard and is mainly made of bricks. it has an elaborate architecture embellished with various Persian arts such as paintings, stucco, wood carving, stone carving, tile work, and mirror work. it consists of a porch (iwan) made out of stone, which has a fabulous decorations on its ceiling and walls. On both sided of the porch, there are symmetrical decorated rooms as well.  A stone pool in addition to date and sour orange trees and palm trees are facing the building which are the specific features and style of Persian gardens. The basement of the monument displays a variety of colorful glasses. It was designed and built elaborately to provide a cool atmosphere throughout the hot summer days of Shiraz.

Gardens 
Narenjestan garden is a great sample of gorgeous Persian gardens of Iran. Persian gardens generally have a rectangular form consisting of four quarters abundant in trees and flowers, streams and pathways, ponds and fountains, a central pavilion, and the walls surrounding the garden. The complex consists of two parts, northern and southern wings. It has been constructed by artisans of Shiraz over 3,500 square meters of land with total foundation area of 940 square meters.

See also
Architecture of Iran
Eram garden
Traditional Persian residential architecture

References

External links

Pictures For narenjestan qavam

Houses completed in 1886
Buildings and structures in Shiraz
Persian gardens in Iran
Architecture in Iran
Houses in Iran
Museums in Iran
Tourist attractions in Shiraz
Buildings of the Qajar period